Nakshatratharattu is a 1998 Indian Malayalam-language romance film directed by M. Shankar, and starring Kunchacko Boban and Shalini in the lead roles. The film was a success at the box office.

Plot
Sunil (Kunchacko Boban) meets Hema (Shalini) while on a bus trip. They quarrel on the bus, to humorous results, but part upon reaching their destination. Sunil goes to meet Swaminathan (Jagadeesh), who organises a job for Sunil as a photographer. For his first job, his boss tells him to find a model. Sunil spots Hema at his office, and as she is a part-time model, he takes pictures of her, and they get to talking in the meantime. Sunil presents the photos to his boss and Hema is chosen as the model.

Hema and Sunil get into a fight the next day, but Sunil suggests that Hema likes him, after which he asks her out. While he is packing to leave, she arrives with a few of her friends. Swaminathan also arrives before them and hides in the house. The two fight again, and she leaves after giving him a shirt she'd bought for him. He throws the shirt into the pond out of anger, but fishes it out the next day and discovers that it has the phrase, "I love you" written on it. Intending now to marry Hema, Sunil goes to see the priest in place of his father, as he is an orphan. Hema, who is also an orphan, is unaware that the same is true for Sunil, and dreams of having a big family. The priest gives his blessing and they marry. Swaminathan organises a house for them in Skyline Colony and they meet Darling Hariharan (Harisree Ashokan). His mother despises the couple since they married without their parents' permission. However, when they finally meet and decide that either Sunil or Hema's parents will be the chief guest, everything falls apart. After they learn that they are both orphans, they go on a hunt to adopt a mother and father, and the rest of the story is formed by how they get along with their new parents.

Cast
 Kunchako Boban as Sunil
 Shalini as Hema
 Thilakan as Sunil and Hema's adopted father
 Bharathi as Sunil and Hema's adopted mother
 Jagadeesh as M. K. Swaminathan
 Kumarakam Reghunath as Fernadus
 Krishnaprasad as Prakash
 Harisree Ashokan as Darling Hariharan
Sai Kumar as Jayan
 Chandni Shaju as Thankamani
 Beena Antony as Jayan's wife
 Anil Murali as Xavier
 Praseetha Menon

Box office
The film was a box-office hit, and ran for more than 90 days. It also helped Kunchako Boban to position himself in Mollywood.

Soundtrack 
The film's soundtrack contains seven songs, all composed by Mohan Sithara, with lyrics by Gireesh Puthenchery.

Reception 
Jayalakshmi K. of Deccan Herald gave the film a verdict of "Good time-pass". Parvathy Nair of The New Indian Express wrote the film is "better than average".

References

External links
 

1998 films
1990s Malayalam-language films
Films scored by Mohan Sithara
Films directed by K. Shankar